Thomas Perry is the name of:

Politics
 Thomas C. Perry (1941–2017), American politician and former president of Perry's Ice Cream
 Thomas Erskine Perry (1806–1913), British Liberal politician and judge in India
 Thomas Johns Perry (1807–1871), Congressman from Maryland
 Thomas Perry (Australian politician) (1914–1998)

Other
 Thomas Perry (luthier) (1738–1818), Irish violin maker
 Thomas Sergeant Perry (1845–1928), American editor, critic, translator, and historian
 Thomas O. Perry (1847–?), mechanical engineer in wind power
 Thomas Perry (priest) (1908–1989), Irish Dean of Clonmacnoise, 1961–1979
 Thomas Perry (author) (born 1947), American mystery novelist

See also
Tom Perry (disambiguation)